XHID-FM is a radio station on 89.7 FM in Álamo, Veracruz. It is known as Radio K-ñon and carries a Grupera format.

History
XEID-AM 1230, a 500-watt daytimer, received its concession on May 24, 1978. Power was later raised to 2.5 kW day and 1 kW night, and eventually XEID moved to 990 kHz with 10 kW day and 2.5 kW night.

XEID moved to FM in 2012.

References

Radio stations in Veracruz
Radio stations established in 1978